A Gausturm (plural Gaustürme) was an organizational unit of the SA in Nazi Germany. 

They were the biggest unit until 1928. They were created by Franz Pfeffer von Salomon, and there were originally 19 of them. Their boundaries purposefully were built around regions of Germany rather than state boundaries, party districts, electoral districts, or military recruiting districts.

References 

Sturmabteilung